The canton of Seilhac-Monédières is an administrative division of the Corrèze department, south-central France. It was created at the French canton reorganisation which came into effect in March 2015. Its seat is in Seilhac.

It consists of the following communes:
 
Affieux
Beaumont
Chamberet
Chamboulive
Chanteix
L'Église-aux-Bois
Lacelle
Lagraulière
Le Lonzac
Madranges
Peyrissac
Pierrefitte
Rilhac-Treignac
Saint-Clément
Saint-Hilaire-les-Courbes
Saint-Jal
Saint-Salvadour
Seilhac
Soudaine-Lavinadière
Treignac
Veix

References

Cantons of Corrèze